H31 may refer to:
 Hanriot H.31, a French biplane fighter aircraft
 , a Royal Navy G-class destroyer later transferred to the Royal Canadian Navy and renamed HMCS Ottawa (H31)
 , a Royal Navy H class submarine